Bernard Bigras (born June 4, 1969) is a Canadian politician.

Born in Montreal, Quebec, Bigras was a Bloc Québécois member of the House of Commons of Canada from 1997 to 2011, representing the district of Rosemont—La Petite-Patrie. He is the former caucus chair of the Bloc, and is a former critic of Children and Youth, Cultural Communities, and Citizenship and Immigration and Environment. Bigras is a former economist and political adviser.

Electoral record (incomplete)

External links
  Bernard Bigras
 How'd They Vote?: Voting history and quotes

1969 births
Bloc Québécois MPs
French Quebecers
Living people
Members of the House of Commons of Canada from Quebec
Politicians from Montreal
21st-century Canadian politicians